The  was a trial regarding the legality of sex reassignment surgery in Japan.

In the mid-20th century, the term "blue boy" was slang for a transgender or transvestite person who was assigned male at birth.

In 1965, a doctor performed sex reassignment surgical operations on three trans women. The doctor was prosecuted for violating eugenics laws and was found guilty of violating Clause 28 of the Eugenics Protection Law. The law prohibited any surgery deemed unnecessary that caused sterilization.

After the trial, sex reassignment surgeries were not performed again until 1998. However, the media coverage of the trial increased general knowledge of sex reassignment surgery and the transgender community in Japan.

References 

LGBT history in Japan
Gender-affirming surgery (male-to-female)
Transgender case law
Transgender in Asia
Trials in Japan
1965 in LGBT history
1965 in Japan